Robert Rubčić (born 2 November 1963) is a Croatian retired footballer and manager.

Playing career
As a player, Rubčić played for HNK Rijeka for much of his career, collecting 184 league caps between 1982 and 1996. He was club's captain for 5 years, and he was also part of the unofficial Croatia national football team (since Croatia was still part of Yugoslavia at the time) in 1990. He debuted on 22 December 1990, in a friendly match against Romania, in Rijeka. He came on as a substitute in 86th minute instead of Zlatko Kranjčar. The result was 2-0 for Croatia.

Managerial career
In his managerial career he led Croatian clubs NK Orijent, NK Crikvenica and HNK Rijeka, he was also an assistant coach in Croatia national football team, as well as the sport director and scout in Rijeka. In September 2010 he became coach of Bangladesh. He signed a 1-year contract, becoming 14th foreigner leading the nation.

He prefers fast playing with lot of running during the whole match, emphasising on the technical aspects. He said that the national team will from now on play 4-2-3-1 formation, which fits the team best.
In the 2010 Asian Games, people had expected a lot from Robert but he couldn't stand up to the expectations of the people as Bangladesh crashed out of the Asian games, losing every game. He was sacked by Bangladesh Federation on 14 June 2011 so close to 2014 World Cup qualifier against Pakistan. He had already left Bangladesh on June 2.

Career statistics

Club statistics

International appearances

Managerial statistics

References

External links
 
 Profile at Prvaliga.si 
 

1963 births
Living people
Footballers from Rijeka
Association football defenders
Yugoslav footballers
Croatian footballers
Croatia international footballers
HNK Rijeka players
HNK Orijent players
NK Jedinstvo Bihać players
ND Gorica players
Yugoslav First League players
Yugoslav Second League players
Croatian Football League players
Slovenian PrvaLiga players
Croatian expatriate footballers
Expatriate footballers in Slovenia
Croatian expatriate sportspeople in Slovenia
Croatian football managers
HNK Orijent managers
HNK Rijeka managers
Bangladesh national football team managers
NK Istra 1961 managers
Croatian expatriate football managers
Expatriate football managers in Bangladesh
HNK Rijeka non-playing staff